Duke Mansion may refer to:

Benjamin N. Duke House in New York City
James B. Duke House in New York City
James Buchanan Duke House in Charlotte, North Carolina, USA